Arthur Henry Stanbridge Hopkins (21 August 1879 – 19 October 1961) was an Australian rules footballer who played for the Geelong Football Club in the Victorian Football League (VFL).

Notes

External links 

1879 births
1961 deaths
Australian rules footballers from Victoria (Australia)
Geelong Football Club players